The 2016–17 Macedonian Second Football League was the 25th season of the Macedonian Second Football League, the second division in the Macedonian football league system. It began on 13 August 2016 and ended on 27 May 2017. It was the last season with the current format, as of 2017–18 season the league will be divided into two groups, East and West, for the first time since the 1999–2000 season, with 10 teams in each group instead of the single league structure.

Participating teams

1 Tikveš, the third placed team in the Third League South, and Novaci, the winner of the Third League South-West, will take the place of Ljubanci and Mladost Carev Dvor, which were declined their participation in the Second League due to financial problems.

League table

Results

Matches 1–18

Matches 19–27

Promotion play-off

First leg

Second leg

Shkupi won 7–2 on aggregate.

See also
2016–17 Macedonian Football Cup
2016–17 Macedonian First Football League
2016–17 Macedonian Third Football League

References

External links
 Football Federation of Macedonia 
 MacedonianFootball.com 

Macedonia 2
2
Macedonian Second Football League seasons